The 2001 Canisius Golden Griffins football team represented Canisius College in the 2001 NCAA Division I-AA football season. The Golden Griffins offense scored 175 points while the defense allowed 404 points.

Schedule

References

Canisius
Canisius Golden Griffins football seasons
Canisius Golden Griffins football